Nieuwesluis is the name of two Dutch villages:

 Nieuwesluis, North Holland
 Nieuwesluis, Zeeland

See also 
 Nieuwe Sluis, a lighthouse in Nieuwesluis, Zeeland
 Nieuwersluis, a village in Utrecht